Jeff(rey) Schmidt may refer to:

 Jeff Schmidt (baseball) (born 1971), MLB pitcher
 Jeff Schmidt (musician), American bassist
 Jeff Schmidt (writer), American physicist and writer
Jeffrey Schmidt (racing driver) in ADAC Formel Masters